John James Knight (7 June 1863 – 24 November 1927) was an Australian journalist, newspaper editor and historian.

Biography
Knight was born at Shelton, Staffordshire, England, the son of James Knight, potter and printer, and his wife Louisa, née Blagg. Knight was taken to New Zealand whilst young and at 11 years of age left school to work in the mechanical department of the Bruce Herald. Six years later he returned to England and with partners started a paper with trades union sympathies. He married at an early age. In 1884 he went to Brisbane and was employed in the printing department of the Brisbane Courier. He soon afterwards was transferred to the literary staff, became the paper's chief parliamentary representative, and in 1900 was made editor of the Observer, an evening paper under the same management as the Courier. 

In 1906 Knight was appointed editor of the Brisbane Courier, in 1916 became managing director of Queensland Newspapers Ltd, and afterwards combined this office with that of chairman of directors for the remainder of his life. In 1918 he represented Queensland on the Imperial mission to the war fronts, and in 1920 visited Canada as a member of the Imperial press delegation. He was chairman of the Queensland section of the Imperial press delegation when a visit was made to Australia in 1925. 

Knight died of pneumonia at Brisbane on 24 November 1927. He left a widow and two daughters.

Works
Knight is noted as a writer on Australian history, especially that of Queensland.  Among his works are:
 In the Early Days, an interesting account of the founding of Queensland
 The Story of South Africa, part author
 Brisbane Past and Present and The True War Spirit
 Nehemiah Bartley, Australian Pioneers and Reminiscences, editor; this work was in an incomplete state at the time of the author's death

References

External links
Knight John James – Brisbane City Council Grave Location Search

1863 births
1927 deaths
Australian journalists
Australian newspaper editors
Burials at Toowong Cemetery
Deaths from pneumonia in Queensland